The men's high jump event at the 1985 Summer Universiade was held at the Kobe Universiade Memorial Stadium in Kobe on 3 and 4 September 1985.

Medalists

Results

Qualification

Final

References

Athletics at the 1985 Summer Universiade
1985